Lakhani is a town and union council of Dera Ghazi Khan District in the Punjab province of Pakistan. The town is part of Taunsa Tehsil. It is located at 30°57'55N 70°33'55E and has an altitude of 181 metres (597 feet).

References

Populated places in Dera Ghazi Khan District
Union councils of Dera Ghazi Khan District
Cities and towns in Punjab, Pakistan